Keith Eric James (born February 4, 1987), formerly of the stage name Marcus Fench, is an American record producer, singer, songwriter and rapper from Chicago, Illinois. He is a frequent collaborator of fellow Chicago singer Jeremih and has worked with various artists such as 50 Cent, Ne-Yo, Nicki Minaj and Wale.

James began performing with his church choir at the age of nine, singing and playing piano and saxophone. James began to write music nightly shortly thereafter. In 2008, James co-wrote the platinum hit "Birthday Sex" with recording artist and childhood friend Jeremih. The track was produced by Mick Shultz. The song peaked at number four on the Billboard Hot 100 and topped the Hot R&B/Hip-Hop. The trio collaborated on the follow-up single "Imma Star", which reached RIAA Certified Gold Status.

In 2015, James released his debut solo project From The Grey EP, lead with single release "Not My Day" and the remix, with a guest verse from singer Cee-Lo Green.

Discography
Jeremih - Jeremih (2009)
Jeremih - All About You (2010)
Nicki	Minaj - The Pinkprint (2014)
Jeremih - Late Nights Mixtape (2012) - executive producer
Wale	- "That	Way" feat. Rick	Ross & Jeremih
Jeremih - "You're Mine"
Diggy Simmons	– "88" feat. Jadakiss
Kevin Gates - "Stop Lyin'"
Rotimi	- "See You Later"
DJ Drama - "My	Moment" feat. 2	Chainz,	Meek Mill & Jeremih
French	Montana	- "Ballin Out" feat. Diddy & Jeremih

References

1987 births
Living people
Songwriters from Illinois
21st-century American rappers